C.A.T.S. Eyes is a British television series made by TVS for ITV between 1985 and 1987. The series was a spin-off from The Gentle Touch, and saw Jill Gascoine reprise her role as Maggie Forbes, portrayed as having left the police force to join an all-female private detective agency called "Eyes", based in Kent, that is a front for a Home Office team called C.A.T.S. (Covert Activities Thames Section). C.A.T.S. Eyes was shown on Friday nights during the first series, before moving to a Saturday night slot for the second and third series. The series was a ratings success, regularly in the top twenty most-watched programmes each week of broadcast.

Synopsis
The C.A.T.S. Eyes team consisted of former police officer Maggie Forbes (Jill Gascoine), refined Oxford graduate Pru Standfast (Rosalyn Landor), the leader of the unit, and streetwise computer expert Frederica "Fred" Smith (Leslie Ash). Nigel Beaumont (Don Warrington) was the "man from the ministry" overseeing their activities. For the second series onwards, the Eyes detective agency front had been dropped; Pru was replaced by the similarly upper-class but more frivolous Tessa "Tess" Robinson (Tracy Louise Ward); and Maggie was elevated to team leader.

The only other character from The Gentle Touch to make an appearance in the series was Maggie's love interest, DI Mike Turnbull (Bernard Holley), who appeared in the second episode of the first series, "The Black Magic Man", to help her with a case. Although they had still been a couple at the end of The Gentle Touch, it was implied in C.A.T.S. Eyes that since that time they had ended their relationship and were still good friends. However, their relationship was left somewhat ambiguous and unresolved. In the first episode, "Goodbye Jenny Wren", Maggie refers to her son, Steve Forbes, as having "taken off to Australia". She said that if he hadn't done so, she would not have volunteered to join the organisation. An ongoing reference throughout the series was whenever Maggie was addressed as "Miss", she would correct it sharply to "Mrs" - referring to her being widowed during the first episode of The Gentle Touch.

Cast
 Jill Gascoine as Maggie Forbes — A former police officer, and leader of the unit following Pru's departure.
 Leslie Ash as Frederica 'Fred' Smith — A streetwise computer expert.
 Rosalyn Landor as Pru Standfast — The leader of the unit, and a refined Oxford graduate. (Series 1)
 Tracy Louise Ward as Tessa Robinson — A new recruit to the unit following Pru's departure and Maggie's promotion. (Series 2—3)
 Don Warrington as Nigel Beaumont — A ministry officer who oversees the work of the unit.

Production
The series was filmed in the then-closed Chatham Dockyard, as well as locations in Medway and Maidstone. All filming was done on location, and post-production editing was performed at the TVS Television Centre in Maidstone. The cars used by the regular cast in the series were loaned by the Ford Motor Company. In the first series, Pru drove a 1985 Ford Escort 1.6i Mark III Cabriolet, which was also featured at the end of the first series title sequence. Fred had a 1984  Fiesta XR2 Mark II, and Maggie used 1985 Escort 1.6 Mark III. In the second series, Fred and Tessa drove 1986 white and Azure blue Ford Escort RS Turbos respectively, with the latter being the only one produced in that colour, whilst Maggie now had a 1986 Ford Sierra Mark I. Similar-looking 1987 models of the vehicles were also used in the third series.

Availability
There has been no domestic commercial release of the series on any format, due to ongoing rights issues. After the production company, TVS, dropped out of the ITV network in 1992, it underwent a number of takeovers. During these years much of the original production paperwork and sales documentation was lost, meaning that the distribution rights to the series could not be determined. The same problem affects the majority of the TVS programme archive. However, a VHS video containing the episodes "Goodbye Jenny Wren", "Frightmare" and "The Double Dutch Deal" was released in Germany in 1987. The theme music from the first series by John Kongos was also released as a single in 1985, with a vocal version on the B-side sung by Louise Burton.

Episodes

Series 1 (1985)

Series 2 (1986)

Series 3 (1987)

References

External links
 
 

1985 British television series debuts
1987 British television series endings
1980s British crime drama television series
1980s British workplace drama television series
Espionage television series
ITV television dramas
British television spin-offs
English-language television shows
Television shows produced by Television South (TVS)
British action television series
British detective television series
Television shows set in Kent
Television shows shot in Kent